The Midland Main Line upgrade is an ongoing upgrade to the Midland Main Line, a railway line in the United Kingdom. There have been a number of proposals to electrify the line over many years but the 2012 proposal and announcement by the UK government was that it would include electrification of the railway line between Bedford, Wellingborough, Corby, Leicester, Derby, Nottingham and Sheffield. The routes between Nottingham and Sheffield and the Erewash Valley line were not included at this time, only the line between Derby and Sheffield. The upgrade was part of the HLOS - High Level Output Specification for Control Period 5 published by the UK Government in 2012. This was also part of a rolling programme of railway electrification projects.

Background 
The section of the line at the southern end between London St Pancras and Bedford was electrified with overhead line in the early 1980s and finished in 1983. This section is mainly a commuter route and often called the Bedpan line, and was subject to industrial dispute when one man electric trains were introduced. As it is a key strategic artery and a radial main line originating in London there have been many calls for it to be electrified especially now the Great Western Main Line and East Coast Main Line are now electrified along with the West Coast Main Line which was electrified in the 1960s and 1970s. The desire to achieve net zero carbon in transport has increased calls for the line to be electrified/decarbonised.

History and earlier proposals 
In the 1970s large scale electrification was proposed on the back of the West Coast Main Line electrification and partially in response to the oil crisis of that decade. In 1981 the British Railways Board published a final document on railway electrification that included the Midland Main Line as high priority. In the intervening years priority was put on other projects such as schemes in Anglia and the East Coast Main Line. Then privatisation and a change in government intervened.

21st century proposals
In July 2009 the Labour government published a document and said it was looking at electrification of the Midland Main Line but no funds had been committed. When originally planned and announced in the 21st Century, the line upgrade was costed at £1.6 billion and it was expected that the line would be electrified as far as Kettering and Corby by 2017. It was then expected that the electrification of the line would continue from Kettering to Leicester, Derby and Nottingham and would occur by 2019 and then the Sheffield section by 2020. Again only the Derby to Sheffield section of the line was planned for electrification and not the Nottingham to Sheffield route, or the through route bypassing both Derby and Nottingham - the Erewash Valley line. In addition an extra track was to be installed between Kettering and Corby to enhance capacity. It appeared in the autumn statement of 2011.

An 2014 article in RAIL Magazine gave a detailed account of the work that lay ahead. Rebuilding of bridges between Bedford and Leicester had already been in progress for a while. Equipment for placing the various electrification tasks such as bases and overhead line equipment was scheduled to start April 2015. The completion date for electric trains arriving at Sheffield Midland station was cited as December 2020 - the cost given as £1.3 billion pounds and also included three station modifications at Leicester, Derby and Sheffield. 422 single track miles of wiring was supposed to occur and a total of 120 bridges modified. Bradway tunnel had already had some heavy maintenance. It was further pointed out that ECAM had been used (as in the project had been through this procedure)- a term the treasury used meaning Enhancements Cost Adjustment Mechanism. Pre- ECAM the cost had been quoted at £900 million. Ryan Scott the Network Rail Programme Engineering Manager was quoted as saying that the minimum number of platforms at Sheffield station - (Sheffield Midland) would be wired to avoid having unnecessary cost added when the station was later remodeled. The whole MML scheme also overlapped with the Electric Spine project.

In June 2015, the then Secretary of State for Transport Patrick McLoughlin informed Parliament the electrification project was being paused, resulting in criticism from local MPs. Mcloughlin said better services could be delivered on Midland Mainline before electrification was completed. He blamed Network Rail for rising costs and missed targets. Lilian Greenwood who at the time was Shadow Transport Secretary, and also an MP for Nottingham South, accused the government of being cynical and that they had delayed this announcement until after the 2015 United Kingdom general election which took place the previous month. There were also complaints that money had been wasted on civil engineering interventions that were no longer needed.

On 30 September 2015 Patrick McLoughlin restarted the scheme. The new expected completion dates were now three years later than originally planned, with electrification to Kettering and Corby now targeted for completion in 2019 and then to Leicester, Derby, Nottingham and Sheffield by 2023. The line from Kettering to Corby was to be doubled, and indeed Network Rail began work in June 2015. The Enhancements plan update of January 2016 showed the project 
on target.  On 27 July 2017 a further briefing paper was issued and the Midland Main Line had a section of its own. This document, and the subsequent announcement by the new Secretary of State for Transport Chris Grayling said the electrification scheme north of Kettering to Derby, Nottingham and Sheffield had been cancelled and that bi-mode trains would be used.

2020 and onwards timeframe
Local news outlets reported in December 2020 that electrification to Market Harborough was moving closer. In February 2021, Network Rail put out a document confirming this saying that devegetation, ecological and biodiversity work was starting on the section between Kettering and north to Market Harborough as a prelude to electrification. They further stated that detailed assessment had already taken place and that this immediate ground clearance would end April 2021. Local news outlets reported this work earlier but they further confirmed it. There will be overlap with some Sub-national transport body such as East Midlands Connect. On 23 March 2021, the Transport Select Committee published its sixth report in the Trains fit for the Future ongoing enquiry, which called for a rolling programme of electrification. It reported that the Midland Main Line was actively being looked at and that the project plans would be broken up into eight route sections. It was reported and confirmed in Modern Railways that the contractor SPL Powerlines was working in conjunction with Network Rail to progress the project north of Market Harborough all the way to Sheffield and Nottingham and that current plans were the route would be divided into eight discrete sections. It was announced that due consideration was being given to environmental protection during the upgrade with Great crested newts being given special mention. On completion of certain parts of the project, environmental aspects and Green credentials were touted.

In September 2020 the TDNS (Traction Decarbonisation Network Strategy) was published. Further electrification was recommended and included the Midland Main Line and fill ins such as Sheffield northwards and Birmingham to Derby. In October 2022 it was reported the TDNS had been quietly abandoned.

On 6 July 2021 it was announced that a Microsoft Teams meeting would be taking place on 12 July 2021 to discuss bidding for extension of the upgrade and electrification of the line from Market Harborough to Sheffield a key stage in the project going ahead. The work would go out to tender in September 2022.

On 18 November 2021, the Integrated Rail Plan (IRP) was published. This affected parts of the HS2 programme including curtailing much of the eastern leg but did include full Midland Main Line electrification and upgrades.

On 21 December 2021 the DfT officially announced that work would start on 24 December 2021 on electrification of the section of line between Kettering and Market Harborough. Grant Shapps controversially claimed this work was proof the IRP was being implemented quickly.

On 24 May 2022 in an article in New Civil Engineer, it was announced that delivery was already in progress from Kettering to Syston South Junction and given the section name RS1. Contractors are being invited to a "Market engagement" event on 15 June 2022 for the remaining sections to allow bimode trains to run on electric power all the way to Sheffield. These sections for continued work were outlined. RS is a Route Section.

In the August 2022 edition of Modern Railways, Roger Ford states that RS3 will have high priority because of the diversionary route capabilities it brings.

 RS1 - Kettering to Wigston South (includes Market Harborough and Braybrooke grid feeder)
 RS2 – Wigston South to Syston
 RS3 – Syston to Trent Junction
 RS4 – Sheet Stores Junction to Chaddesden Sidings (Derby)
 RS5 – Trent Junction to Nottingham
 RS6 – Chaddesden Sidings (Derby) to Toadmoor Tunnel
 RS7 – Toadmoor Tunnel to London Road
 RS8 – London Road to Sheffield North

The September 2022 Mini-Budget, includes RS3 as one of a list of infrastructure "projects which have particularly high potential to move to
construction at an accelerated pace".

Power supply and civils
The electrified line will be fed via the autotransformer system. To cope with the higher electricity usage south of Bedford into St Pancras, the upgrade involves boosting the existing power supplies. This contract has been awarded to SPL Powerlines. In addition, new grid feeders will be needed at Braybrooke, just south of Market Harborough. At the north end of the scheme it was proposed that a grid feeder would be located in the Chesterfield area. The middle section of the upgrade scheme would have the grid feeder located in the Kegworth area. Work was announced as starting on the grid feeder in the Market Harborough area on 8 April 2021. The transformers were delivered to the site in December 2021.

There are a number of bridges requiring work.

Timeline summary 
Source for most of section information.
 November 2011 - Autumn statement includes electrification of the line
 September 2015 - Electrification paused by the Secretary of State shortly after publication of the Hendy review
 October 2015 - Electrification unpaused but timeline for completion is delayed
 July 2019 - (RSSB) Rail Industry Decarbonisation Task Force report published
 April 2021 - Work on Braybrooke grid feeder started.
 November 2021 Integrated Rail Plan (IRP) published stating electrification of the whole line would take place.
 21 December 2021 - Official announcement and press release that Kettering to Market Harborough electrification is approved and "spades in the ground" work starting 24 December 2021.
 24 May 2022 - confirmation that contracts had been let and delivery was in progress all the way to Wigston South Junction
 1 July 2022 - confirmation that work was starting on RS1 Market Harborough to South Wigston
 23 September 2022 - Midland Mainline Phase 3 (RS3 - Syston to Trent Junction) listed as one of the "infrastructure projects which will be accelerated as fast as possible" in the September 2022 Mini-Budget
 January 2023 - Further bridge raising on RS2 section commencing.
 February 28 2023 - announcement that contractors were being sought for the entire route from South Wigston to Sheffield and design approved in principle.

See also 
 21st-century modernisation of the Great Western Main Line
 Felixstowe–Nuneaton railway upgrade
 History of rail transport in Great Britain 1995 to date
 Integrated Rail Plan for the North and Midlands
 List of proposed railway electrification routes in Great Britain
 North West England electrification schemes
 Overhead line
 Railway electrification in Scotland
 TransPennine Route Upgrade
 West Coast Main Line route modernisation

References

Further reading 
 
 
 
 
 
 
 
 
 

Railways authorised but not built in the United Kingdom
Electrification
Railway upgrades in the United Kingdom